RuPaul's Drag Race Live! is an American residency show in Las Vegas, Nevada featuring past competitors from the television show RuPaul's Drag Race. The variety show features a mix of original music, lip syncs, comedy, and dance numbers directed by RuPaul and choreographed by Drag Race resident choreographer Jamal Sims. It is produced by World of Wonder and Voss Events and performs five nights a week. Performed at the Flamingo Las Vegas, which formerly housed the eleven-year run of the Donny and Marie Osmond show, the show premiered on January 26, 2020 and ran until March 15, 2020 when the COVID-19 pandemic put performances on hold. Performances were set to start up again on August 5, 2021 and run until December 31, 2021. Performances resumed in 2022 with a new rotating cast featuring newcomers Jaida Essence Hall, Eureka O'Hara, Trinity K. Bonet, and Plastique Tiara and swing cast members Coco Montrese, Kahanna Montrese, and Alexis Mateo.

RuPaul's Drag Race Live! was originally announced in September 2019 at RuPaul's DragCon NYC.  The live show features a rotating cast of fourteen performers, all Drag Race alumni. These queens are Yvie Oddly, Aquaria, Asia O'Hara, Coco Montrese, Derrick Barry, Eureka O'Hara, India Ferrah, Kahanna Montrese, Kameron Michaels, Kim Chi, Naomi Smalls, Vanessa Vanjie Mateo, and Shannel.  The show's Pit Crew all double as dancers in the queens' numbers. Crew members include AJ Watkins, Dallas Eli, Filip Lacina, Michael Silas, Nick Lemer, and Sebastian Gonzalez and Ryan Grainger as the assistant choreographer and dance captain.

In January 2022, a new roster of rotating queens was announced, featuring newcomers Jaida Essence Hall, Eureka O'Hara, Trinity K. Bonet, and Plastique Tiara.

Music
The show's score includes songs from the past eleven seasons of RuPaul’s Drag Race and new numbers, written by RuPaul, Leland, and World of Wonder's chief creative officer Tom Campbell and produced by Gabe Lopez. " A soundtrack EP was released through RuCo Inc on January 27, 2020. Three songs from the show, "Mirror Song", "Losing is the New Winning", and "I Made It" were performed in a medley in an episode of Drag Race season 12 by Crystal Methyd, Gigi Goode, Jackie Cox and Jaida Essence Hall.

Documentary
On July 22, 2020, a six part documentary series called RuPaul's Drag Race: Vegas Revue was announced, which premiered on August 21, 2020 on VH1. An extended first look aired on July 24, 2020 during the fifth-season finale of RuPaul's Drag Race All Stars.

References 

2020 concert residencies
Las Vegas shows
LGBT events in the United States
Variety shows
RuPaul's Drag Race
Drag events
2021 concert residencies